Donja R. Love is an American playwright. Originally from Philadelphia, Pennsylvania, Love identifies himself as an Afro-Queer, HIV positive playwright and filmmaker. His work has been produced in multiple states around the United States, but he is mainly based in New York City and Philadelphia. He is best known for his 2019 play one in two based on the 2017 CDC study that found that one in two black gay or bisexual men will be diagnosed with HIV at some point in their life.

Early life
Donja R. Love grew up in Philadelphia, Pennsylvania, where he eventually graduated from high school. He then attended Temple University majoring in African American Studies and Theater until leaving before completing his degree. In 2008, Love went to the doctor with a cough and came out diagnosed with HIV. Grappling with his condition, Love recalls turning to sex and drinking for comfort after this. He attributes his recovery from these two things to the Christian church and playwriting. He credits some of his motivation and inspiration from his mother who lives in Philadelphia and taught him that life would be difficult because of his identity. Love began writing, producing, and directing his own plays in the Philadelphia area.

Once Donja R. Love was established in Pennsylvania, he moved to New York City to continue his career as a playwright. While in New York, he completed multiple playwriting fellowships to further his craft until being accepted to Juilliard for playwriting for 2018–2019.

Career
Donja R. Love began playwriting in the late 2000s. Love's most well-known piece, one in two was written around the ten-year anniversary of his HIV diagnosis. He recounts writing this play in the notes app on his phone from his bed. He wrote it as a way to therapeutically process his emotions and it was not initially meant to be produced. However, now it is his most known piece of work that has been produced Off-Broadway.

In the past few years, Donja R. Love has begun working in film and television. His most notable works include Modern Day Black Gay, a web series, and Once a Star, a short film.

In 2020, Love began a writing workshop specifically for writers with HIV named Write It Out! This project is partially inspired by Love's own experience having turned to writing as his career after his diagnosis. One in two established Love as a leader in the HIV positive realm of theatre, especially for narratives involving queer people of color. The writing-intensive is being put on by the National Queer Theater. Broadway Cares/Equity Fights AIDS is in collaboration with this project.

Philosophy
Love is particularly interested in sharing the stories of marginalized people. Being a black, queer, HIV positive playwright, he often writes from his own experience in order to pursue this goal. Starting out as a performer, writing was not Love's original position in the theatre. By becoming a writer, Love has been able to share more specific narratives of people who are HIV positive in a way that theatre has not seen before. He cites his inspiration from writers such as Toni Morrison and James Baldwin, two highly influential Black writers.

He writes plays that tell the stories of Black Queer Folx for the audiences made of Black Queer Folx.   His work focuses on normalizing these marginalized identities and bringing joy as well as depth to the typical monolithic portrayal of LGBTQ+ people of color. Through his productions, he emphasizes collaboration with directors and actors of color who help highlight these stories.

List of plays
Following is a list of plays by Donja R. Love
Sugar in Our Wounds
Fireflies
In the Middle
One in Two
The Trade
Soft
The North Star
A Ugandan Family
The Review

Accolades
Love has received extensive media coverage for his work as an activist and playwright with profiles in TheBody.com, American Theatre Magazine, them, The Philadelphia Inquirer, TDF Stages, BroadwayWorld, and Playbill.

Love has received numerous awards for his work including leading POZ Magazine's POZ 100 List for 2021, the 2021 Terrence McNally Award for What Will Happen to All That Beauty?, POZ Magazine's 2020 Best New Play Award for one in two, the 2018 Laurents/Hatcher Foundation Award for Sugar in Our Wounds, the 2017 Princess Grace Award Playwrighting Fellowship, the 2016 Lark Theatre's Van Lier New Voices Playwrighting Fellowship, and the 2016/2017 Playwrights Realm's Writing Fellowship.

References

American dramatists and playwrights
Living people
Year of birth missing (living people)
Temple University alumni
Juilliard School alumni
LGBT African Americans
American LGBT writers